The Spencer Canyon fault is an active seismic fault located in central Washington state.  It was discovered in 2014 following a years-long search for the source of the 1872 North Cascades earthquake that was felt over a wide area of the Pacific Northwest.  In 2015, researchers reporting the discovery of the fault also located the epicenter of the 1872 event near the town of Chelan.

References

Seismic faults of Washington (state)